Der Besuch der alten Dame (The Visit of the Old Lady) is an opera in three acts by Gottfried von Einem to a German libretto by Friedrich Dürrenmatt, based on his 1956 play of the same name.

Performance history
The work was first performed at the Vienna State Opera on 23 May 1971, with Horst Stein conducting and Christa Ludwig in the principal role. The German premiere was staged at the Deutsche Oper Berlin on 1 March 1972. Further productions followed in Strasbourg and Karl Marx Stadt in 1973, and in Stockholm in 1976. The work had its United States premiere on 25 October 1972 at the San Francisco Opera in a production directed by Francis Ford Coppola and using an English translation by Norman Tucker.

Recent productions include a run of five performances at the Görlitz Theatre, Germany, in May/June 2010.

Roles

Recordings
A recording of the world premiere performance at the Vienna State Opera was released by Deutsche Grammophon on LP. This recording has been reissued on CD by Amadeo.

References

Operas by Gottfried von Einem
1971 operas
German-language operas
Operas
Operas based on plays